Firbas is a surname. Notable people with the surname include: 

Franz Firbas (1902–1964), German botanist
Jan Firbas (1921–1945), Czech linguist